The Times is an American daily newspaper published Mondays through Saturdays in Pawtucket, Rhode Island, covering eastern Providence County, Rhode Island, and some adjacent towns in Massachusetts. It is owned by RISN Operations Inc.

History
The Pawtucket newspaper was founded as an afternoon daily, The Evening Times, in 1885, by George O. Willard. Five years later, David O. Black bought the paper, and became the first of four generations to keep it in his family. Black commissioned a new building for the newspaper at 23 Exchange street. The Times has been published in this building since 1896.

It was sold in December 1957 to New England Newspapers Inc., a forerunner of Ingersoll Publications, which later acquired the competitor The Call of Woonsocket. Journal Register Company bought Ingersoll in 1989.

In 2007, a new company, RISN, formed to purchase Journal Register's Rhode Island properties, including The Times.

Sisters and competitors 
In its coverage area, The Times competes with the state's largest daily, the Providence Journal, and The Valley Breeze Pawtucket edition. It also competes in nearby Massachusetts towns with the Milford Daily News. In 2008, former Times journalist Douglas Haddon co-founded All Pawtucket, All the Time, publishing a free weekly print edition.

RISN (which stands for Rhode Island Suburban Newspapers) also owns two other daily newspapers in Rhode Island, The Call of Woonsocket (which shares a publisher with The Times) and the Kent County Daily Times of West Warwick, as well as several weekly newspapers. All of these properties were sold for $8.3 million to RISN in early 2007 by Journal Register Company.

See also
 Pawtucket Times Building

References

External links 
 The Times Website

Newspapers published in Rhode Island
Daily newspapers published in the United States
Pawtucket, Rhode Island
Companies based in Providence County, Rhode Island
RISN Operations
Publishing companies established in 1885
1885 establishments in Rhode Island